Redmanol Chemical Products Company was an early plastics manufacturer formed in 1913.  Lawrence V. Redman was its president. In 1922, the Redmanol Company, the Condensite Company of America, and General Bakelite were consolidated into the Bakelite Corporation.

References 

Defunct manufacturing companies of the United States
Manufacturing companies established in 1913 
American companies established in 1913